The Guyana Chronicle is a daily newspaper owned by the Guyanese government. The company also publishes a weekly Sunday Chronicle.

External links
Guyana Chronicle Online

Newspapers published in Guyana
Publications with year of establishment missing
English-language newspapers published in South America